Biathlon at the 2020 Winter Youth Olympics took place in Les Tuffes, France.

Events

Medal table

Boys' events

Girls' events

Mixed events

Qualification

Summary

References

External links
Results Book – Biathlon

 
2020 in biathlon
2020 Winter Youth Olympics events
2020
Biathlon competitions in France